was a Japanese baseball second baseman who played with the Tokyo Kyojin/Yomiuri Giants from 1938 to 1941, and again from 1946 to 1956. He later managed the Kintetsu Buffalo from 1959 to 1961, and was elected to the Japanese Baseball Hall of Fame in 1980.

External links

1919 births
2002 deaths
People from Saijō, Ehime
Baseball people from Ehime Prefecture
Japanese Baseball Hall of Fame inductees
Japanese baseball players
Managers of baseball teams in Japan
Nippon Professional Baseball second basemen
Nippon Professional Baseball third basemen
Osaka Kintetsu Buffaloes managers
Yomiuri Giants players
20th-century Japanese people